Vincennes is a city in and the county seat of Knox County, Indiana, United States. It is located on the lower Wabash River in the southwestern part of the state, nearly halfway between Evansville and Terre Haute.  Founded in 1732 by French fur traders, notably François-Marie Bissot, Sieur de Vincennes, for whom the Fort was named, Vincennes is the oldest continually inhabited European settlement in Indiana and one of the oldest settlements west of the Appalachians.

According to the 2010 census, its population was 18,423, a decrease of 1.5% from 18,701 in 2000. Vincennes is the principal city of the Vincennes, IN Micropolitan Statistical Area, which comprises all of Knox County and had an estimated 2017 population of 38,440.

History
The vicinity of Vincennes was inhabited for thousands of years by different cultures of indigenous peoples. During the Late Woodland period, some of these peoples used local loess hills as burial sites; some of the more prominent examples are the Sugar Loaf Mound and the Pyramid Mound.  In historic times, prominent local Indian groups who drove these people out were the Shawnee, Wabash, and the Miami tribe.

The first European settlers were French, when Vincennes was founded as part of the French colony of New France. Later on, it would be transferred to the colony of Louisiana. Several years later, France lost the French and Indian War (part of the Seven Years' War), and as result ceded territory east of the Mississippi River, including Vincennes, to the victorious British.

Once the area was under British control, it was associated with the Province of Quebec until after the Revolutionary War. It then became part of the Illinois Country of the Colony and Dominion of Virginia. Next it became part of Knox County in the Northwest Territory, and it was later included in the Indiana Territory. Vincennes served as capital of the Indiana Territory from 1800 until 1813, when the government was moved to Corydon.

New France
The first trading post on the Wabash River was established by Sieur Juchereau, Lieutenant General of Montréal.  With thirty-four Canadiens, he founded the company post on October 28, 1702, to trade for Buffalo hides with American Indians.  The exact location of Juchereau's trading post is not known, but because the Buffalo Trace crosses the Wabash at Vincennes, many believe it was here.  The post was a success; in the first two years, the traders collected over 13,000 buffalo hides.  When Juchereau died, the post was abandoned.  The French-Canadian settlers left what they considered hostile territory for Mobile (in present-day Alabama), then the capital of Louisiana.

The oldest European town in Indiana, Vincennes was officially established in 1732 as a second French fur trading post in this area. The Compagnie des Indes commissioned a French officer, François-Marie Bissot, Sieur de Vincennes, to build a post along the Wabash River to discourage local nations from trading with the English. Vincennes founded the new trading post near the meeting points of the Wabash and White rivers, and the overland Buffalo Trace. Vincennes, who had lived with his father among the Miami tribe, persuaded the Piankeshaw to establish a village at his trading post. He also encouraged Canadien settlers to move there, and started his own family to increase the village population. Because the Wabash post was so remote, however, Vincennes had a hard time getting trade supplies from Louisiana for the native nations, who were also being courted by English traders. The boundary between the French colonies of Louisiana and Canada, although inexact in the first years of the settlement, was decreed in 1745 to run between Fort Ouiatenon (below the site of modern-day Lafayette, Indiana) and Vincennes.

In 1736, during the French war with the Chickasaw nation, Vincennes was captured and burned at the stake near the present-day town of Fulton, Mississippi. His settlement on the Wabash was renamed Poste Vincennes in his honor.

Louisiana Governor Jean-Baptiste Le Moyne, Sieur de Bienville, next appointed Louis Groston de Saint-Ange de Bellerive to command Poste Vincennes.

As the French colonists pushed north from Louisiana and south from Canada, however, the American colonists to the east continued to push west. In addition, British traders lured away many of Indians who had traded with the Canadiens. This competition escalated in the Ohio Country until 1754 and the eruption of the French and Indian War (the North American theater of the Seven Years' War between Britain and France.)

British America

On February 10, 1763, when New France was ceded to the British at the conclusion of the French and Indian War, Vincennes fell under the authority of Great Britain. British officer John Ramsey came to Vincennes in 1766.  He took a census of the settlement, built up the fort, and renamed it Fort Sackville.  The population grew quickly in the years that followed, resulting in a unique culture of interdependent Native Americans, Canadien settlers and British traders.

Vincennes was far from centers of British power.  In 1770 and 1772, Thomas Gage, the commander in chief of Britain's North American forces, received warnings that the residents of Vincennes were agitating against the Crown, and were inciting native tribes along the river trade routes to attack British traders. The Colonial Secretary, the Earl of Hillsborough, ordered the residents to be removed from Vincennes in response. Gage demurred while the residents responded to the charges against them, claiming to be "peaceful settlers, cultivating the land which His Most Christian Majesty [meaning the King of France] granted us."  The issue was resolved by Hillsborough's successor, Lord Dartmouth, who insisted to Gage that the residents were not lawless vagabonds, but British subjects whose rights were protected by the Crown. Gage took no action against the residents of Vincennes. In 1778, residents at Poste Vincennes received word of the French alliance with the American Second Continental Congress from Father Pierre Gibault and Dr. Jean Laffont. They mobilized in support of the American revolutionaries, as did the local Piankeshaw, led by Chief Young Tobacco.

Revolutionary War

Lieutenant Colonel George R. Clark, Captain Leonard Helm, and others created a plan to capture the French forts that the British occupied after Louisiana was ceded. After Kaskaskia was captured by Clark, Lieutenant Governor Henry Hamilton sent British soldiers and reinforcements from Detroit to Fort Vincennes and helped to rebuild the fort.

The Italian merchant and Patriot Francis Vigo found Clark and informed the British presence at the fort. Vigo served with the Patriots, ordered war supplies from the Spanish to help, and acted as a secret agent for the Patriots. Clark rounded up enough men to outnumber the British and planned a surprise attack on Fort Vincennes in the heart of winter, a horrible time when no armies were expected to be able to attack due to illness, lack of food, and the flood waters that were high during this time. The Patriots won the Battle of Vincennes on February 23–24, 1779. Hamilton thought of Vincennes as "a refuge for debtors and Vagabonds from Canada." George Rogers Clark recaptured Fort Sackville in the Battle of Vincennes without losing a single soldier.

Post-Revolution turmoil
Although the Americans would remain in control of Vincennes, it took years to establish peace. In 1786, Captain John Hardin led a mounted Kentucky militia across the Ohio River and destroyed a friendly Piankeshaw town near Vincennes.  This led to a series of attacks and counter-attacks between Wabash Indians and American settlers.  Finally, on 15 July 1786, the Wabash landed in forty-seven war canoes at Vincennes to drive the Americans back to Kentucky. The Indians warned the Canadians in advance of their attack and assured them that they would not be harmed, but the Canadians warned the Americans.  They quickly supplied Fort Patrick Henry and waited out the siege.  One American was killed and four wounded, and the war party left after destroying the Americans' farms.

In response, Virginia Governor Patrick Henry authorized George Rogers Clark to raise the Kentucky militia and mount an expedition against the warring tribes. General Clark gathered a force of 1,000 militia and departed Clarksville 9 September 1786, along the Buffalo Trace.  The militia spent ten days in Vincennes before marching north along the Wabash, but men deserted by the hundreds.  Clark was soon forced to return to Vincennes without any action taken.  Clark left 150 men to help defend Vincennes, but this force soon turned into a lawless mob, and the citizens of Vincennes petitioned Congress for help. Secretary of War Henry Knox sent Colonel Josiah Harmar and the First American Regiment to restore order.  The Kentucky militia fled Vincennes at the approach of U.S. Regulars.

Colonel Harmar left 100 regulars under Major Jean François Hamtramck and directed them to build a fort, Fort Knox. Vincennes remained an isolated town, difficult to supply due to its position deep within Indian territory.  Secure transport to and from Vincennes meant travelling with a large, armed party, whether over land or via the Wabash River.  On 30 September 1790, Major Hamtramck led 350 men from Vincennes as far north as the Vermillion River, to engage some of the Indian villages which had been at war with Vincennes.  The Kickapoo tracked the party, however, and evacuated every village along the way before the Americans arrived.  Hamtramck destroyed some abandoned villages, but he did not engage any war parties.  Faced with desertions from Kentucky militia, Hamtramck returned to Vincennes.  The expedition had done no serious harm to the enemies of Vincennes, but it distracted some of the Wabash villages while Josiah Harmar, now a General, led a much larger expedition up through Ohio country towards Kekionga.

The Vincennes Tract

The earliest land claims by inhabitants of Vincennes were based on a sale by the Indians to the French in 1742 of a tract of land containing 1.6 million acres, known as the Vincennes Tract. It was a rectangular block lying at right angles to the course of the Wabash River at Vincennes. The tract was ceded by France to Britain by treaty in 1763 after the French and Indian War.  On October 18, 1775, an agent for the Wabash Company purchased two tracts of land along the Wabash River from the Piankeshaw tribe called the 'Plankashaw Deed'.  In these deeds, the Vincennes Tract was excepted, and it was the first recognition of the tract in period documents. Eventually, the United States Supreme Court invalidated the deeds.

The claims based on French sovereignty or individual deeds issued under it were eventually rejected by congress, because if there were such grants, they passed to the United States by the Treaty of Paris 1783.

By right of conquest, George Rogers Clark secured this land for the United States in 1779 and the Land Act of 1796 honored its boundaries.

The Vincennes Donation Lands were embodied in An Act for granting lands to the Inhabitants and settlers at Vincennes and the Illinois country, in the territory northwest of the Ohio, and for confirming them in their possessions (1791).

Growth of the town
By 1798, the population had reached 2,500.  Vincennes was no longer considered a trading outpost, but a thriving city.

Elihu Stout published the first newspaper in the Indiana Territory in 1804 at Vincennes.  The Indiana Gazette debuted on July 31, 1804.  Fire destroyed the printing presses in 1806, but Stout revived the newspaper as the Western Sun in 1807.

Vincennes served as the first capital of Indiana Territory until it was moved to Corydon on May 1, 1813.

In 1826, "A party of Shawnee Indians ... in men, women, and children, to 500, passed through this place [Vincennes] ... from their reservation at Wapaghkonetta, moving to the Mississippi. The celebrated Indian prophet, and a son of the great Tecumseh, were in the company."

Slavery

Slavery was practiced in the 16th century, when the present-day state of Indiana was part of New France (1534–1763), by the French and Native Americans. When the area became part of the Northwest Territory, slavery was banned by the Northwest Ordinance of 1787, but slavery and indentured servitude continued.
 Slaveholders created a "loophole", that the provision did not apply to African Americans who were already enslaved in the state. In 1816, the Constitution of Indiana made forced labor illegal, stating that  "there shall be neither slavery nor involuntary servitude in this state."

Polly Strong, an enslaved woman of Vincennes, was the plaintiff in a case that argued that she should be free. After losing in the Harrison County Circuit Court, she won the case at the Indiana Supreme Court on July 22, 1820, and she was freed. In the case of 
Clark's attorney appealed the decision with the Indiana Supreme Court in the case of Mary Clark v. G.W. Johnston was a former slave who was made an indentured servant and lived in Vincennes. She won her freedom on November 6, 1821, when the Indiana Supreme Court ruled that servitude violated the state's 1816 Constitution. This was a landmark contract law case for indentured servants and foretold the end of forced labor in Indiana.

Unofficial city flag

This flag for the city of Vincennes, Indiana, albeit unofficial, is used around the city. It features the signature V, four fleurs-de-lis, symbolizing the city's French heritage, its existence in four centuries: 18th, 19th, 20th, and 21st, since the city's establishment in 1732. Similar in appearance to the flag of Indianapolis, Vincennes' flag is more squared in appearance and has a diamond center rather than a circle. It represents the layout of Vincennes. White stripes radiating from the diamond represent Vincennes' part in the settlement of the frontier, as it was at the crossroads of several great pioneer trails.

Geography
Vincennes is located on the banks of the Wabash River at the western edge of Knox County; this is also the western edge of the state of Indiana, and Illinois is across the river to the west. U.S. Route 41 passes through the city from north to south, and U.S. Route 50 passes just to the north of the city from east to west.

Climate
Vincennes has a humid subtropical climate with hot summers and cool winters with heavy rainfall at times throughout much of the year.

Measurable precipitation occurs on an average of 105.6 days each year.

Measurable snowfall occurs on only 2.6 days. The snowiest season was 1989–90 when  fell.

Education

Public schools
Elementary Schools
South Knox Elementary School
Tecumseh – Harrison Elementary
Franklin Elementary
Vigo Elementary
Riley Elementary
Washington Elementary (Decommissioned in May 2010)
Middle School
South Knox Middle-Highschool
Clark Middle School
High School
South Knox Middle-Highschool
Lincoln High School

Parochial schools
Elementary school
Flaget Elementary (K–5)
High school
Vincennes Rivet High School (6–12)

Other private schools
Southwestern Indiana Youth Village (4–12)

Higher education
Vincennes University was established in 1801 as Jefferson Academy. It is the oldest college of higher learning in Indiana.
Purdue Polytechnic Institute maintains a satellite campus in Vincennes in a partnership with Vincennes University.

Demographics

2010 census
As of the census of 2010, there were 18,423 people, 7,407 households, and 4,108 families residing in the city. The racial makeup of the city was 91.9% White, 4.7% African American, 0.3% Native American, 0.7% Asian, 0.7% from other races, and 1.7% from two or more races. Hispanic or Latino of any race were 1.9% of the population.

There were 7,407 households, of which 26.6% had children under the age of 18 living with them, 36.8% were married couples living together, 14.1% had a female householder with no husband present, 4.5% had a male householder with no wife present, and 44.5% were non-families. 36.0% of all households were made up of individuals, and 14.1% had someone living alone who was 65 years of age or older. The average household size was 2.19 and the average family size was 2.83.

The median age in the city was 33 years. 19.2% of residents were under the age of 18; 20.8% were between the ages of 18 and 24; 21.4% were from 25 to 44; 23.6% were from 45 to 64; and 15% were 65 years of age or older. The gender makeup of the city was 50.3% male and 49.7% female.

2000 census
As of the census of 2000, there were 18,701 people, 7,614 households, and 4,332 families residing in the city. The racial makeup of the city was 94.34% White, 3.28% African American, 0.25% Native American, 0.72% Asian, 0.06% Pacific Islander, 0.48% from other races, and 0.88% from two or more races. Hispanic or Latino of any race were 1.02% of the population.

There were 7,614 households, out of which 26.3% had children under the age of 18 living with them, 40.8% were married couples living together, 12.4% had a female householder with no husband present, and 43.1% were non-families. 35.8% of all households were made up of individuals, and 14.9% had someone living alone who was 65 years of age or older. The average household size was 2.20 and the average family size was 2.85.

In the city, the population was spread out, with 20.0% under the age of 18, 20.5% from 18 to 24, 24.0% from 25 to 44, 20.3% from 45 to 64, and 15.1% who were 65 years of age or older. The median age was 33 years. For every 100 females, there were 98.6 males. For every 100 females age 18 and over, there were 97.3 males.

The median income for a household in the city was $26,289, and the median income for a family was $35,424. Males had a median income of $27,029 versus $20,254 for females. The per capita income for the city was $14,993. About 15.0% of families and 20.7% of the population were below the poverty line, including 25.9% of those under age 18 and 12.7% of those age 65 or over.

Government
The city government consists of a seven-member city council. Five of whom are elected from districts the other two are elected at large. The mayor is elected in a citywide vote.

Time zone controversy
On November 4, 2007, Knox County joined Daviess, Martin, Pike, and Dubois counties in returning to the Eastern Time zone. Controversy concerning time in Indiana has caused a change in the time zone of Vincennes on three different occasions since the Standard Time Act of 1918.

Legacy
The Revolutionary War battle at Vincennes was featured in the 1901 novel Alice of Old Vincennes by Maurice Thompson.  Four ships have also been named  in honor of this battle; as well as for the city. The first  was an 18-gun sloop-of-war commissioned in 1826 and sold in 1867. The second  was a  heavy cruiser commissioned in 1937 and lost in the Battle of Savo Island in 1942. The third  was a  light cruiser commissioned in 1944 and decommissioned in 1946. The fourth and most recent  was a  guided missile cruiser commissioned in 1985 which was decommissioned and scrapped in 2005.

Notable people
 Bruce Barmes (1929-2014), baseball player, Washington Senators
 Clint Barmes (b. 1979), baseball player, San Diego Padres
 David Carter, retired football player, center and guard Houston Oilers
E. Wallace Chadwick (1884-1969), U.S. Congressman for Pennsylvania's 7th congressional district from 1947 to 1949
 Albert K. Dawson (1885–1967), photographer, film correspondent in World War I
 James C. Denny (1829-1887), Indiana Attorney General (1872-1874)
 Henry Dodge (1782–1867), U.S. Senator from Wisconsin
 Mike Eskew, former Chairman and CEO of UPS
 James Freeman Gilbert, geophysicist
 Bruce Bouillet, guitarist for Racer X
 David Goodnow, television news broadcaster
 William Henry Harrison (1773–1841), Indiana Territorial Governor and 9th President of the United States
 Mitch Henderson, basketball head coach, Princeton
 Charles T. Hinde, businessman and riverboat captain; briefly lived in Vincennes
 Jane Jarvis, (1915-2010), organist for the New York Mets and jazz musician
 Buck Jones (1891–1942), actor, silent and 1930s film star
 John Rice Jones, politician and jurist
 Stanislaus P. La Lumiere, president of Marquette University
 Julian Morgenstern (1881–1976), rabbi, professor, and president of Hebrew Union College
 Alvy Moore (1921–1997), actor
 Curtis Painter (b. 1985) football player, quarterback Purdue University, Indianapolis Colts, Baltimore Ravens, New York Giants
 William Edward Phipps, film and television actor, born in Vincennes
 Ollie Pickering (1870–1952), first batter in MLB American League history; lived and died in Vincennes
 Red Skelton (1913–1997), comedian and film actor, star of The Red Skelton Show
 Richard L. Stevens, brigadier general, U.S. Army Corps of Engineers
 Dan Stryzinski, football player, punter for Indiana University and eight NFL teams
 Sarah Knox Taylor (1814–1835), daughter of Zachary Taylor and first wife of Jefferson Davis
 Waller Taylor, lawyer, Adjutant General, United States Senator from Indiana
 Alice Terry (1899–1987), actress and director, silent films; wife of director Rex Ingram
 Samuel Williams (1851–1913), judge and politician
 Benjamin Willoughby (1855-1940), Justice of the Indiana Supreme Court

Local attractions
 George Rogers Clark National Historical Park, the memorial and park built for the war hero George Rogers Clark.

 St. Francis Xavier Cathedral and Library, the oldest Catholic church in the state of Indiana and Indiana's oldest library.
 Grand Rapids Dam was once a dam on the Wabash River near present-day Vincennes; its remains are still visible.
 Grouseland, the mansion home of William Henry Harrison, 9th United States President.
 Fort Knox II: Operated by the Indiana State Museum and Historic Sites Corp, Fort Knox was the jumping off point for the Tippecanoe Campaign in 1811.  Outline of the fort is marked for self-guided tours.
 Fort Sackville, one of the forts of Vincennes.
 The U.S. Navy has named four ships in honor of Vincennes.
 The Servant of God, Bishop Simon Bruté de Remur, first Catholic Bishop of the Diocese of Vincennes.
 The Indiana Territorial Capitol.  Is the primary site owned by the Indiana State Museum and Historic Sites Corp in Vincennes.  The building was once the center of government for the Indiana Territory from 1800 to 1813.
 The Indiana Military Museum (indianamilitarymuseum.org)
 Pantheon Theatre
 The Red Skelton Museum of American Comedy on the campus of Vincennes University contains memorabilia of radio, TV, and movie star Red Skelton, who was born in Vincennes. As of 2017, his birth home still exists, but is in private hands.
 In addition to the George Rogers Clark National Historical Park, St. Francis Xavier Cathedral and Library, Grouseland, Fort Knox II, and Indiana Territorial Capitol, Gregg Park, Hack and Simon Office Building, Kimmell Park, Old State Bank, Pyramid Mound, Vincennes Fortnightly Club, and the Vincennes Historic District are listed on the National Register of Historic Places.

Media

Television
 WVUT PBS (22) – 22.1 / 22.2 / 22.3 – Vincennes University

Radio
 91.1 FM WVUB "Blazer 91-1" – Vincennes University
 92.1 FM WZDM "Wisdom 92-1" – The Original Company
 96.7 FM WFML –
 1450 AM WAOV – The Original Company

Newspaper
 Vincennes Sun-Commercial

Notes

See also

Indiana Territory
Forts of Vincennes, Indiana
Grand Rapids Dam
Grand Rapids Hotel
Piankashaw Indians
USS Vincennes, 4 ships

References
 
 
 
 Vincennes. Encyclopædia Britannica. Encyclopædia Britannica Online. Encyclopædia Britannica, 2011. Retrieved 2 May 2011.

External links

 Vincennes, Knox County Convention and Visitors Bureau, Indiana
 City of Vincennes, Indiana
 Vincennes University
 Vincennes brief history (Vincennes University)
 Vincennes School Corporation
 George Rogers Clark National Park
 Indiana Territorial Capitol
 Revolutionary War Archives – Battle of Vincennes

 
Populated places established in 1732
1732 establishments in the French colonial empire